Law & Business (Russian: Закон и Бизнес; Ukrainian: Закон і Бізнес) is Ukraine's weekly legal newspaper. It circulates to lawyers, judges, and general counsel from state offices. The paper reports legal information of national importance, including legal news for the business and private sectors, court decisions, verdicts, practitioners' columns, and coverage of legislative issues.

The newspaper was founded in 1991, and as of 2011 its print circulation was about 16,000. It is published in the Russian and Ukrainian languages. Both language editions and its archives are freely available online.

Legal newspapers
Ukrainian-language newspapers
Russian-language newspapers published in Ukraine
Weekly newspapers published in Ukraine
Publications established in 1991
1991 establishments in Ukraine